Wyldwood is a census-designated place (CDP) in Bastrop County, Texas, United States. The population was 3,694 at the 2020 census.

Geography

Demographics

As of the 2020 United States census, there were 3,694 people, 905 households, and 663 families residing in the CDP.

As at the 2000 census there were 2,310 people, 835 households, and 646 families in the CDP. The population density was 191.7 people per square mile (74.0/km2). There were 884 housing units at an average density of 73.4/sq mi (28.3/km2). The racial makeup of the CDP was 82.60% White, 8.35% African American, 0.52% Native American, 0.74% Asian, 0.09% Pacific Islander, 4.42% from other races, and 3.29% from two or more races. Hispanic or Latino of any race were 14.94% of the population.

Of the 835 households 35.7% had children under the age of 18 living with them, 61.9% were married couples living together, 11.5% had a female householder with no husband present, and 22.6% were non-families. 16.9% of households were one person and 4.1% were one person aged 65 or older. The average household size was 2.77 and the average family size was 3.11.

The age distribution was 27.0% under the age of 18, 8.1% from 18 to 24, 29.2% from 25 to 44, 26.3% from 45 to 64, and 9.4% 65 or older. The median age was 37 years. For every 100 females, there were 96.6 males. For every 100 females age 18 and over, there were 97.9 males.

The median household income was $57,333 and the median family income  was $61,088. Males had a median income of $40,500 versus $28,097 for females. The per capita income for the CDP was $20,217. About 4.3% of families and 4.8% of the population were below the poverty line, including 5.1% of those under age 18 and none of those age 65 or over.

Education
The area is served by the Bastrop Independent School District. Most students in Wyldwood are zoned to Bluebonnet Elementary School, while some are zoned to Cedar Creek Elementary School. All Wyldwood residents are zoned to Cedar Creek Intermediate School, Cedar Creek Middle school, and Cedar Creek High School.

References

External links
 

Census-designated places in Bastrop County, Texas
Census-designated places in Greater Austin
Greater Austin